Jean-Nicolas Verreault (born August 28, 1967) is a Canadian actor from Quebec. He is most noted for his starring role as Evian in the 2000 film Maelström, for which he was a Genie Award nominee for Best Supporting Actor at the 21st Genie Awards in 2001.

He was also a Prix Gémeaux winner for Best Actor in a Dramatic Series or Program for his performance as Steve in the television series Je voudrais qu'on m'efface.

References

External links

1967 births
Living people
20th-century Canadian male actors
21st-century Canadian male actors
Canadian male film actors
Canadian male television actors
French Quebecers
Male actors from Quebec